Bulimulus trindadeae is a fossil species of air-breathing land snail, a terrestrial pulmonate gastropod mollusk in the family Bulimulidae, from the Paleocene deposits of the Itaboraí Basin in Brazil.

References

Bulimulidae
Gastropods described in 1971